Cedrus deodara, the deodar cedar, Himalayan cedar, or deodar, is a species of cedar native to the Himalayas.

Description
It has a conic crown with level branches and drooping branchlets.

Chemistry 
The bark of Cedrus deodara contains large amounts of taxifolin. The wood contains cedeodarin, ampelopsin, cedrin, cedrinoside, and deodarin (3′,4′,5,6-tetrahydroxy-8-methyl dihydroflavonol). The main components of the needle essential oil include α-terpineol (30.2%), linalool (24.47%), limonene (17.01%), anethole (14.57%), caryophyllene (3.14%), and eugenol (2.14%).  The deodar cedar also contains lignans and the phenolic sesquiterpene himasecolone, together with isopimaric acid. Other compounds have been identified, including (−)-matairesinol, (−)-nortrachelogenin, and a dibenzylbutyrolactollignan (4,4',9-trihydroxy-3,3'-dimethoxy-9,9'-epoxylignan).

Etymology
The botanical name, which is also the English common name, is derived from the Sanskrit term devadāru, which means "wood of the gods", a compound of deva "god" and dāru "wood and tree".

Distribution and habitat

The species natively occurs in East-Afghanistan, South Western Tibet, Western Nepal, Northern Pakistan, and North-Central India.

Cultivation

It is widely grown as an ornamental tree, often planted in parks and large gardens for its drooping foliage. It can succeed in rather cool-summer climates, as in Ushuaia, Argentina.

The most cold-tolerant trees originate in the northwest of the species' range in Kashmir and Paktia Province, Afghanistan. Named cultivars from this region include 'Eisregen', 'Eiswinter', 'Karl Fuchs', 'Kashmir', 'Polar Winter', and 'Shalimar'. Of these, 'Eisregen', 'Eiswinter', 'Karl Fuchs', and 'Polar Winter' were selected in Germany from seed collected in Paktia; 'Kashmir' was a selection of the nursery trade, whereas 'Shalimar' originated from seeds collected in 1964 from Shalimar Gardens, Kashmir and propagated at the Arnold Arboretum.

C. deodara and the three cultivars 'Feelin' Blue', 'Pendula' and 'Aurea' have gained the Royal Horticultural Society's Award of Garden Merit (confirmed 2021).

Uses

Construction material

Deodar is in great demand as building material because of its durability, rot-resistant character and fine, close grain, which is capable of taking a high polish. Its historical use to construct religious temples and in landscaping around temples is well recorded. Its rot-resistant character also makes it an ideal wood for constructing the well-known houseboats of Srinagar, Kashmir. In Pakistan and India, during the British colonial period, deodar wood was used extensively for construction of barracks, public buildings, bridges, canals and railway cars. Despite its durability, it is not a strong timber, and its brittle nature makes it unsuitable for delicate work where strength is required, such as chair-making.

Herbal Ayurveda 
C. deodara is used in Ayurvedic medicine.

The inner wood is aromatic and used to make incense. Inner wood is distilled into essential oil. As insects avoid this tree, the essential oil is used as insect repellent on the feet of horses, cattle and camels. It also has antifungal properties and has some potential for control of fungal deterioration of spices during storage. The outer bark and stem are astringent.

Because of its antifungal and insect repellent properties, rooms made of deodar cedar wood are used to store meat and food grains like oats and wheat in Shimla, Kullu, and Kinnaur district of Himachal Pradesh.

Cedar oil is often used for its aromatic properties, especially in aromatherapy. It has a characteristic woody odor which may change somewhat in the course of drying out. The crude oils are often yellowish or darker in color. Its applications include soap perfumes, household sprays, floor polishes, and insecticides, and is also used in microscope work as a clearing oil.

Incense 
The gum of the tree is used to make rope incenses in Nepal and Tibet.

Culture
Among Hindus, as the etymology of deodar suggests, it is worshiped as a divine tree. Deva, the first half of the Sanskrit term, means divine, deity, or deus. Dāru, the second part, is cognate with (related to) the words durum, druid, tree, and true. Several Hindu legends refer to this tree. For example, Valmiki Ramayan reads:

The deodar is the national tree of Pakistan, and the state tree of Himachal Pradesh, India.

See also
 List of Indian timber trees

References

External links

 Conifers Around the World: Cedrus deodara - Himalayan Cedar.

deodara
Trees of Afghanistan
Flora of the Indian subcontinent
Flora of Tibet
Medicinal plants of Asia
Plants used in Ayurveda
Trees of temperate climates
Least concern plants
Least concern biota of Asia
National symbols of Pakistan
Garden plants of Asia
Drought-tolerant trees
Ornamental trees